The Garden of Allah is a 1916 American silent drama film directed by Colin Campbell and starring Helen Ware, Tom Santschi and Eugenie Besserer. It is based on the 1904 novel of the same title by Robert Smythe Hichens, adapted a number of times including a 1937 sound film starring Marlene Dietrich. Location shooting took place in the Mojave Desert. A print of the film survives in the George Eastman Museum.

Cast
 Helen Ware as Domini Enfilden 
 Tom Santschi as Boris Androvsky 
 Will Machin as Capt. De Trevignac 
 Matt Snyder as Count Anteoni (*aka Matt B. Snyder)
 Harry Lonsdale as Father Roubier 
 Eugenie Besserer as Lady Rens 
 James Bradbury Sr. as The Sand Diviner 
 Al W. Filson as Lord Rens 
 Cecil Holland as Hadj 
 Frank Clark as Father Beret 
 Billy Jacobs as Child 
 Pietro Sosso as Batouch 
 Camille Astor as Suzanna

References

Bibliography
 Matthew Bernstein & Gaylyn Studlar. Visions of the East: Orientalism in Film. Rutgers University Press, 1997.

External links
 
 lobby poster

1916 films
1916 drama films
1910s English-language films
American silent feature films
Silent American drama films
American black-and-white films
Films directed by Colin Campbell
Films based on British novels
Films set in Africa
1910s American films